The Functional Capacity Index (FCI) is a measure of a person's level of function for the following 12 months after sustaining some form of illness or injury. The FCI incorporates ten physical functions and gives each a numerical value on a scale of 0 to 100, with 100 representing no limitations on a person's everyday function.

See also
 Abbreviated injury scale

References

Medical scoring system